The 1890–91 Irish Cup was the eleventh edition of the premier knock-out cup competition in Irish football. 

Linfield won the tournament for the first time, defeating Ulster 4–2 in the final.

Results

First round

|}

1 Match ordered to be replayed after Black Watch protested it was too dark to finish the match.

Replays

|}

1 Match was ordered to be replayed after Strabane protested against Omagh's rough play.
2 Cliftonville scratched (withdrew) after claiming that the ordering of a replay with 24 hours notice did not give them enough time to prepare.

Second replay

|}

Second round

|}

Third round

|}

Fourth round

|}

Semi-finals

|}

Final

References

External links
 Northern Ireland Cup Finals. Rec.Sport.Soccer Statistics Foundation (RSSSF)

Irish Cup seasons
1890–91 domestic association football cups
1890–91 in Irish association football